Jean-Baptiste-François de Montullé (3 February 1721 – 26 August 1787) was a French magistrate, who was born and died in Paris. His daughter Émilie-Sophie became an artist, whilst Jean-Baptiste himself was an art collector, though he had to sell off his collection thanks to financial difficulties at the end of 1783 - it included five paintings by Antoine Watteau. He was also executor to the collector Jean de Jullienne.

Sources
Notes prises aux archives de l'État-civil de Paris, par le comte de Chastellux, Paris, 1875, p. 443.

Art collectors from Paris
18th-century French judges
1721 births
1787 deaths